P. K. Sasi (പി കെ ശശി) is an Indian politician from Communist Party of India (Marxist) and the former MLA of Shornur, Kerala. 
 
P. K. Sasi, is the Secretariat member of CPIM Palakkad District Committee and President of CITU Palakkad District committee.

References

Communist Party of India (Marxist) politicians from Kerala